Carlo Alex Erdei (born 22 March 1996) is a Romanian football player who plays for Nemzeti Bajnokság II club Tiszakécske.

Club career
On 21 April 2017, he was signed by Nemzeti Bajnokság I club Balmazújvárosi FC.

On 28 June 2019, he was signed by Liga II club FK Csíkszereda.

References

External links 

1996 births
Living people
Sportspeople from Satu Mare
Romanian people of Hungarian descent
Romanian footballers
Romania youth international footballers
Association football midfielders
Liga II players
Nemzeti Bajnokság I players
Nemzeti Bajnokság II players
CS Pandurii Târgu Jiu players
FC Olimpia Satu Mare players
Balmazújvárosi FC players
FK Csíkszereda Miercurea Ciuc players
Kaposvári Rákóczi FC players
Tiszakécske FC footballers
Romanian expatriate footballers
Expatriate footballers in England
Romanian expatriate sportspeople in England
Expatriate footballers in Hungary
Romanian expatriate sportspeople in Hungary
Romanian sportspeople of Hungarian descent